Benny Lindelauf (born 15 December 1964) is a Dutch writer of children's literature.

Career 

Lindelauf made his debut in 1998 with the book Omhoogvaldag, a collection of sixteen short stories. Lindelauf has written various stories for children's magazines Okki and Taptoe.

He received the Thea Beckmanprijs in 2004 for his book Negen open armen. For this book he also received the Gouden Zoen award in 2005. In 2011, he won the Nienke van Hichtum-prijs for his book De hemel van Heivisj. In the same year he also won the Dioraphte Jongerenliteratuur Prijs and the Woutertje Pieterse Prijs for this book. In 2017, he received the Gouden Lijst award for his book Hoe Tortot zijn vissenhart verloor.

Lindelauf's books have been illustrated by various illustrators including Karina Mucek, Wilbert van der Steen and Martijn van der Linden.

Awards 

 2004: Thea Beckmanprijs, Negen open armen
 2005: Gouden Zoen, Negen open armen
 2011: Nienke van Hichtum-prijs, De hemel van Heivisj
 2011: Woutertje Pieterse Prijs, De hemel van Heivisj
 2011: Dioraphte Jongerenliteratuur Prijs, De hemel van Heivisj
 2017: Gouden Lijst, Hoe Tortot zijn vissenhart verloor
 2021: Woutertje Pieterse Prijs, Hele verhalen voor een halve soldaat (with Ludwig Volbeda)

References

External links 
 
 Benny Lindelauf (in Dutch), Digital Library for Dutch Literature

1964 births
Living people
Dutch children's writers
20th-century Dutch male writers
21st-century Dutch male writers
Woutertje Pieterse Prize winners
Nienke van Hichtum Prize winners